IACS may refer to:

 Indian Association for the Cultivation of Science
 Industrial Automation and Control Systems are also referred to as Industrial control systems
 Innovation Academy Charter School
 Integrated Administration and Control System
 International Annealed Copper Standard, a unit of electrical conductivity
 International Association of Classification Societies
 International Association of Cryospheric Sciences
 Inter-Asia Cultural Studies, a quarterly peer-reviewed academic journal